Messenkamp is a municipality in the district of Schaumburg, in Lower Saxony, Germany.

References

Municipalities in Lower Saxony
Schaumburg